The 84th Emperor's Cup 
Statistics of Emperor's Cup in the 2004 season.

Overview
It was contested by 80 teams, and Tokyo Verdy won the cup for the fifth time.

Results

First round
Hiroshima University of Economics 4–0 Sanyo Electric Tokushima
Gainare Tottori 3–2 TDK
Mitsubishi Motors Mizushima 3–2 Renaiss Gakuen Kōga
Alouette Kumamoto 5–2 Mitsubishi Heavy Industries Nagasaki
Oita Trinita U-18 1–0 Fuji University
Hachinohe University 3–1 Central Kobe
Saga University 2–0 Haguro High School
FC Ryukyu 3–0 Yamaguchi Teachers
Kochi University 2–1 Hannan University
Honda Lock 4–1 Teikyo Daisan High School
Sony Sendai 6–1 Maruoka High School
Japan Soccer College 1–0 Chukyo High School

Second round
Sony Sendai 5–0 Yumoto High School
Sagawa Printing 2–1 Mitsubishi Motors Mizushima
Momoyama Gakuin University 2–0 National Institute of Fitness and Sports in Kanoya
Tochigi SC 1–0 Gainare Tottori
FC Ryukyu 1–0 Fukuoka University
Tenri University 3–1 Saga University
Ehime FC 3–0 Kochi University
Tokai University 3–2 Otsuka Pharmaceuticals
Sagawa Express Tokyo SC 2–0 Ryutsu Keizai University
Honda FC 3–2 Sapporo University
Gunma Horikoshi 2–1 Luminoso Sayama
Hachinohe University 8–3 Yokkaichi University
Thespa Kusatsu 6–0 Mattō FC
Oita Trinita U-18 2–1 Kihoku Shūkyūdan
Honda Lock 4–1 Nagano Elsa
ALO's Hokuriku 2–0 Hiroshima University of Economics
Japan Soccer College 0–0 (PK 4–2) JEF United Ichihara Amateur
Chukyo University 2–1 Komazawa University
Alouette Kumamoto 2–0 Takamatsu Kita High School
FC Central Chūgoku 1–1 (PK 5–4) Shizuoka FC

Third round
Thespa Kusatsu 1–0 Momoyama Gakuin University
Shonan Bellmare 1–0 Hachinohe University
Ventforet Kofu 1–0 Sony Sendai FC
Omiya Ardija 2–1 ALO's Hokuriku
Gunma Horikoshi 2–1 Tokai University
Yokohama FC 4–0 Oita Trinita U-18
Avispa Fukuoka 9–1 Tenri University
Montedio Yamagata 3–2 FC Ryukyu
Sagan Tosu 2–0 Tochigi SC
Consadole Sapporo 2–1 Honda Lock
Vegalta Sendai 2–0 Sagawa Printing
Kyoto Purple Sanga 11–2 Japan Soccer College
Kawasaki Frontale 4–0 Ehime FC
Mito HollyHock 4–0 Alouette Kumamoto
Honda FC 8–0 FC Central Chūgoku
Sagawa Express Tokyo SC 3–2 Chukyo University

Fourth round
Yokohama F. Marinos 2–1 Montedio Yamagata
Gamba Osaka 3–1 Sagan Tosu
Gunma Horikoshi 1–0 Kashiwa Reysol
Omiya Ardija 1–0 Shimizu S-Pulse
Júbilo Iwata 3–2 Sagawa Express Tokyo SC
FC Tokyo 1–0 Vegalta Sendai
Kashima Antlers 1–0 Mito HollyHock
Tokyo Verdy 2–1 Kyoto Purple Sanga
Shonan Bellmare 3–2 Albirex Niigata
Avispa Fukuoka 1–3 Urawa Red Diamonds
Thespa Kusatsu 2–1 Cerezo Osaka
Consadole Sapporo 2–1 JEF United Ichihara
Kawasaki Frontale 3–2 Vissel Kobe
Yokohama FC 1–0 Sanfrecce Hiroshima
Oita Trinita 2–1 Ventforet Kofu
Nagoya Grampus Eight 3–0 Honda FC

Fifth round
Júbilo Iwata 2–1 Gunma Horikoshi
Tokyo Verdy 2–1 Nagoya Grampus Eight
Kashima Antlers 3–2 Kawasaki Frontale
Consadole Sapporo 1–0 Oita Trinita
Gamba Osaka 5–0 Yokohama FC
FC Tokyo 6–3 Omiya Ardija
Yokohama F. Marinos 1–2 Thespa Kusatsu
Urawa Red Diamonds 3–0 Shonan Bellmare

Quarter finals
Thespa Kusatsu 0–3 Tokyo Verdy
Kashima Antlers 0–1 Gamba Osaka
Urawa Red Diamonds 2–1 FC Tokyo
Consadole Sapporo 0–1 Júbilo Iwata

Semi finals
Tokyo Verdy 3–1 Gamba Osaka
Júbilo Iwata 2–1 Urawa Red Diamonds

Final

Tokyo Verdy 2–1 Júbilo Iwata
Tokyo Verdy won the championship.

References
 NHK

Emperor's Cup
Emp
2005 in Japanese football